ʻAbd al-Razzāq (ALA-LC romanization of ) is a male Muslim given name, and in modern usage, surname. It is built from the Arabic words ʻabd and al-Razzāq, one of the names of God in the Qur'an, which give rise to the Muslim theophoric names. It means "servant of the all-provider".

Because the letter r is a sun letter, the letter l of the al- is assimilated to it. Thus although the name is written in Arabic with letters corresponding to Abd al-Razzaq, the usual pronunciation corresponds to Abd ar-Razzaq. Alternative renderings include ‘Abd ar-Razzaq, Abdul Razzaq, Abdur Razaq, Abdul Razzak and others, all subject to variable spacing and hyphenation.

It may refer to:

Given name

Afghan 
Abdul Razaq (born 1971), Afghan, former Guantanamo detainee (ISN 356)
Abdul Razzaq, Afghan, former Guantanamo detainee (ISN 923)
Abdul Razak, Afghan, former Guantanamo detainee (ISN 1043)
Abdur Razzaq (Taliban Interior Minister)
Abdul Razzaq (Taliban governor)
Abdul Razaq (cricketer)

Algerian 
 Abderrazak Bounour (born 1957), Algerian runner

Arabian 
‘Abd ar-Razzaq as-San‘ani (early), Sunni Islamic scholar of the Science of hadith
Shaikh Syed Abdul Razzaq Jilani, (1133–1207 CE), shaikh of Qadiriyya order after Abdul Qadir Jilani

Bangladeshi 
 Abdur Razzaq (professor) (1914–1999), Bangladeshi politics and economics educator

Abdur Razzak (actor) (1942–2017), Bangladeshi film actor
Abdur Razzaq (politician) (1942–2011), Bangladeshi politician
Abdur Razzaq (barrister) (born 1949), Bangladeshi politician and lawyer
Abdur Razzak (politician) (born 1950), Food Minister of Bangladesh
Abdur Razzak (cricketer) (born 1982), Bangladeshi cricketer
Abdul Razzak Rajib, Bangladeshi cricketer

British 
 Abdulrazak Gurnah (born 1948), Tanzanian-British novelist

Chinese 
 Abdul Razakah, Chinese held in Guantanamo (ISN 219)

Egyptian 
Abd El-Razzak El-Sanhuri (1895–1971), Egyptian legal scholar

Kuwaiti 
Abdul-Razzak Al-Adwani (1928–1996), Kuwaiti academic administrator

Libyan 
 Abdul Razzaq as-Sawsa, Libyan politician
 Abdelrazak Ali Abdelrahman, Libyan held in Guantanamo (ISN 685)

Ghanaian 
 Karim Abdul Razak (born 1956), Ghanaian footballer
 Ibrahim Abdul Razak (born 1983), Ghanaian footballer

Indian 
 Abdool Razack Mohamed (1906–1978), Indian-Mauritian politician
Abdur Razzaque Ansari, Indian weavers revolution leader
K. M. Abdul Razack, Indian politician

Indonesian 
 Abdul Razak (canoeist) (born 1964), Indonesian canoer

Iraqi 
 'Abd al-Razzaq al-Hasani (1903–1997), Iraqi historian

 Abdul-Razzaq Ahmed Taha (c. 1910 – c. 1998 ??), Iraqi chess player

 Arif Abd ar-Razzaq (1921–2007), Prime Minister of Iraq

 Abd ar-Razzaq an-Naif (1933–1978), Iraqi politician
 Haidar Abdul-Razzaq (born 1982), Iraqi footballer
 Ziad Abderrazzak Mohammad Aswad, Iraqi politician
Abdul Razak al-Hashimi, Iraqi diplomat
 Abdul Razzaq Ahmed (born 1940), Iraqi footballer
Nashwan Abdulrazaq Abdulbaqi, known as Abdul Hadi al Iraqi (born 1961), Iraqi Kurd held in Guantanamo (ISN 10026)

Iranian 
 Abdur Razzaq (traveller) (1413–1482), Persian traveller to India

Ivorian 
 Abdou Razack Traoré (born 1988), Ivorian footballer
Abdul Razak (footballer) (born 1992), Ivorian footballer

Malaysian 
 Abdul Razak Hussein (1922–1976), Prime Minister of Malaysia
 Abdul Razak Baginda (born 1960), Malaysian political writer
 Abdul Razak Mohaideen (born 1965), Malaysian film director
 Aidil Zafuan Abdul Radzak (born 1987), Malaysian footballer

Moroccan 
 Abderrazak Khairi (born 1962), Moroccan footballer
 Abderrazzak Jadid (born 1983), Moroccan footballer

Myanma 
 U Razak (Abdul Razak) (1898–1947), Burmese politician

Nigerian 
 Abdulrazak Ekpoki (born 1982), Nigerian footballer

Pakistani 
 Abdul Razzak Yaqoob (1944–2014), Pakistani businessman
 Abdur Razzaq Iskander (1935–2021), Pakistani Islamic scholar and writer
 Abdul Razzaq (cricketer) (born 1979), Pakistani cricketer
 Abdur Razzaq (cricketer), Pakistani cricketer, Kalat
 Abdul Razzaq (field hockey) (born 1921), Pakistani Olympic hockey player

Palestinian 
 Abdel-Razak al-Yehiyeh (born 1929), Palestinian politician
 Omar Abd al-Razaq, Palestinian politician
Abelhaleem Hasan Abdelraziq Ashqar, Palestinian business professor imprisoned in the US

Saudi Arabian 
 Abd al Razaq Abdallah Hamid Ibrahim al Sharikh (born 1984), Saudi, former Guantanamo detainee (ISN 67)

Somali 
 Abdirizak Haji Hussein (1924–2014), Prime Minister of Somalia
 Abdirisak Omar Mohamed Minister of Internal Security
 Abdirizak Bihi social activist

Syrian 
Abdelrazak al-Restom al-Dandachi (1899–1935), Syrian politician
Abdelrazaq Al Hussain (born 1986), Syrian footballer
Abdul Razzaq al-Mahdi, Syrian Ahrar ash-Sham cleric
Abdul Razzak Al-Assad, (1940-2022),Syrian doctor in Anguillara Veneta Italy

South African 
 Abdul Razak, South African cricketer

Tanzanian 
 Abdulrazak Gurnah (born 1948), Tanzanian-British novelist

Trinidadian 
 Abdul Razack (cricketer) (1888-1946), Trinidadian cricketer

Yemeni 
Abdullah Abdul Razzaq Badhib, known as Abdullah Badhib (1931–1975), political activist from Aden known as founder of Yemeni communism
Abdul Al Razzaq Muhammad Salih, Yemeni held in Guantanamo (ISN 233)

Surname
Wafaa Abed Al Razzaq (born 1952), Iraqi poet
Dana Hussein Abdul-Razzaq (born 1986), Iraqi runner

Other
Bandar Tun Abdul Razak (established 1979), town in Malaysia
Universiti Tun Abdul Razak (established 1997), university in Malaysia
Sekolah Datuk Abdul Razak (founded 1957), school in Malaysia
SMK Tun Abdul Razak (founded 1959), school in Malaysia
Masjid Al-Abdul Razak (built 1965), mosque in Singapore
Musannaf of Abd al-Razzaq, book written by ‘Abd ar-Razzaq as-San‘ani

References

Arabic masculine given names
Pakistani masculine given names